WTSM is a radio station on 97.9 FM licensed to Woodville, Florida, United States, serving Tallahassee. It is owned by Radio Training Network, Inc., and broadcasts a Contemporary Christian format branded as "The Joy FM".

History
WJZT began broadcasting on September 7, 2003, a year after the station was granted a construction permit by the Federal Communications Commission. It originally aired a smooth jazz format and was owned by Kathy and Ernie Petrone. In 2006, WJZT Communications, LLC, a division of Horizon Broadcasting, acquired the station for $2.3 million.

After a brief stint as oldies "Cruisin' 97.9", WJZT flipped to sports on December 1, 2010, as "Tallahassee's Sports Monster", using ESPN Radio programming.

Horizon Broadcasting reached a deal to sell WTSM and WHLG in Port St. Lucie to Radio Training Network, which owns The Joy FM regional network of Christian radio stations, for $1.3 million in May 2021. The sale was consummated on August 31, 2021.

On September 1, 2021, WTSM changed their format from sports to contemporary Christian, branded as "The Joy FM".

Previous logo

References

External links

TSM
Radio stations established in 2003
2003 establishments in Florida
Contemporary Christian radio stations in the United States